Viceamiral Dorin Dănilă (born June 29, 1953) was the Chief of the Romanian Naval Forces Staff from 3 November 2006 to 3 July 2010. He was born in Braşov. In 2010 he was promoted to the rank of vice admiral and discharged from active duty.

Studies
 Mircea cel Bătrân Naval Academy
 Military Academy, Command and Staff Faculty
 Naval Post-Academic Course
 International Humanitarian Law Course
 French language Course
 Public Relations Course
 Post-Academic Course in Strategic Command, War College.

Assignments
 Communications officer on board an ASW ship: 1976-1978;
 Staff Officer, Communications Branch, ASW Ship Squadron: 1978-1980;
 Commanding Officer, ASW Ship: 1980-1981;
 Deputy Commander, MCM Ship Squadron: 1983-1989;
 Operations Officer, Maritime Division (Ex. Operational Command): 1989-1990;
 Deputy Commander, ASW Ship Squadron: 1990-1994;
 Commander, ASW Ship Squadron: 1994-1999;
 Deputy Commander, ASW Ship Brigade: 1999-2000;
 Deputy Commander, Maritime Flotilla: 2000-2001;
 Chief of Doctrine and Statutes Section, Romanian Naval Forces Staff: 2001-2002;
 Commander – Diving Centre: 2002-2005;
 Commander – Naval Base: 2005-2006;
 Fleet Commander: 01.06-03.11.2006
 Chief of the Romanian Naval Forces Staff – since 03.11.2006

Personal life
Dorin Dănilă is married and has one daughter.

References

Living people
Romanian Naval Forces admirals
People from Brașov
1953 births
20th-century Romanian military personnel
21st-century Romanian military personnel